This is a list of airports in Chad, grouped by type and sorted by location.

Chad, officially known as the Republic of Chad (or Jumhūriyyat Tshād), is a landlocked country in Central Africa. It is bordered by Libya to the north, Sudan to the east, the Central African Republic to the south, Cameroon and Nigeria to the southwest, and Niger to the west. The country is divided into 22 regions, which are further divided into departments and Sub-prefectures.

Chad's capital and largest city is N'Djamena, which is the location of the country's main airport.  Scheduled passenger service is available at N'Djamena and five other cities.

Toumaï Air Tchad is the national flag carrier airline, operating domestic services within Chad as well as scheduled international services to other African nations.



Airports 

Airport names shown in bold indicate the airport has scheduled service on commercial airlines.

See also 

 Transport in Chad
 Chadian Air Force
 List of airports by ICAO code: F#FT - Chad
 Wikipedia: WikiProject Aviation/Airline destination lists: Africa#Chad

References 
 AIS ASECNA: CHAD AD2 Aerodromes:
 
 
 
 
 
 
  - includes IATA codes
  - ICAO/IATA codes
  - ICAO/IATA codes
  - ICAO codes
 Airport records for Chad at Landings.com. Retrieved 2013-08-27

Chad
 
Airports
Airports
Chad